The Two Sergeants (French:Les Deux Sergents) is an 1823 play by the French writer Théodore Baudouin d'Aubigny. It is a melodrama set during the Napoleonic Wars. Numerous versions were made of it including an 1831 British play Comrades and Friends by Isaac Pocock and an Italian novel.

Film adaptations
The play has been made into four films:
 The Two Sergeants (1913 film), an Italian silent film directed by  Eugenio Perego
 The Two Sergeants (1922 film), an Italian silent film directed by Guido Brignone
 The Two Sergeants (1936 film), an Italian film directed by Enrico Guazzoni
 The Two Sergeants (1951 film), an Italian film directed by Carlo Alberto Chiesa

References

Bibliography
 Nicoll, Allardyce. A History of English Drama 1660-1690. Cambridge University Press, 2009.

1823 plays
French plays adapted into films